"Time" is a song by American rapper NF, released on July 12, 2019 as the fourth single from his fourth studio album, The Search (2019). The song is NF's second highest-charting song on the Billboard Hot 100 to date, peaking at number 41.

Composition 
The song opens with a violin instrumental. NF reflects on his relationship with a woman, which is characterized by misunderstandings and tensions. Nevertheless, he is still deeply in love with her and is trying to hold on to the relationship. He explains that he is willing to change, but will need to take time.

Charts

Weekly charts

Year-end charts

Certifications

References 

2019 singles
2019 songs
Caroline Records singles
NF (rapper) songs
Songs written by NF (rapper)
Songs written by Tommee Profitt